Jajui-ye Olya (also Romanized as Jājūī-ye ‘Olyā; also known as Jājū, Jājū ‘Olyā, and Joojah) is a village in Jahangiri Rural District, in the Central District of Masjed Soleyman County, Khuzestan Province, Iran. As of the 2006 census, its population was 35, in 5 families.

References 

Populated places in Masjed Soleyman County